

Republic of Ireland 
Since the 1990s, many political scandals relating to miscarriage of justice, dereliction of duty and corruption by public officials have resulted in the establishment of extra-judicial Tribunals of Enquiry, which are typically chaired by retired High-Court judges and cannot make judgements against any of the parties. Since 2004 many such scandals have been investigated by the less costly but less transparent Commissions of Investigation. Most Irish scandals. however, do not result in trials or public enquiries.

1970s
 1970 The Arms Crisis: Division in Irish Cabinet when two ministers arranged to import arms for the IRA in Northern Ireland
 1974 Dublin and Monaghan Bombings Investigation: Aborted Garda investigation into alleged MI5 collusion in bombings of Dublin and Monaghan (reported 2007)
 1976 Thundering Disgrace: Defence Minister, Paddy Donegan refers to Uachtarán na hÉireann, Cearbhall Ó Dálaigh as a "Thundering Disgrace" in an address to troops and receives no sanction from Taoiseach, Liam Cosgrave

1980s
 1981 The Stardust Fire enquiry: Fire in night-club with pad-locked fire doors results in 48 deaths. Following a 12-day investigation, nobody is held accountable
 1982 The "GUBU" Affair: Attorney General flies abroad as fugitive double-murderer is arrested in his apartment
 1983 The phone tapping scandal: FF Justice Minister orders Gardaí to "tap" the phones of political journalists"
 1984 The Kerry Babies case: Gardaí in Kerry concoct fantastical infanticide charges against a young woman and her family

1990s
 1990 The Duffy Tape: FF Presidential candidate, Brian Lenihan Snr, admits attempting to influence a decision of the out-going president to dissolve the Dáil in 1982
 1991 Beef Export Credit Insurance scheme: ITV World in Action exposes practices of Goodman International Ltd. and other Irish Beef exporters insured directly by the Irish Government
 1994 BTSB anti-D scandal: Anti-D immunoglobulin contaminated with Hepatitis C was given to pregnant mothers since the 1970s. BTSB seeks to minimize compensation by delaying and contesting applications of terminally ill victims
 1994 Guinness Mahon/Ansbacher Cayman: Des Traynor's off-shore numbered bank account scheme for Ireland's Rich and Famous (reported 2002)
 1995 HIV/Hep. C contaminated haemophilia factors: BTSB and NHTC continue to provide haemophiliacs with untreated blood products after risks of HIV and Hepatitis infections were known since mid-1980s
 1996 Carlos Salinas de Gortari disgraced former president of Mexico is reported to be living in exile in Ireland and moving in the best social circles
 1996 Award of 2nd mobile network licence: While evaluating bidders, the Dept. of Transport, Energy and Communications held exclusive negotiations with the Esat Digifone consortium whose selection was prematurely announced by the minister 
 1996 Soldier "K"'s Army deafness claim: Compensation claim for hearing damage that that triggered a flood of similar claims that eventually cost the Department of Defense in excess of €290M
 1997 The Corrupt rezoning of land for development in County Dublin: An advert offering a £10k reward for information on planning corruption results in the state's longest-running public inquiry
 1996 Ben Dunne's largesse: Ben Dunne  Jnr.'s unorthodox payments to politicians Charles Haughey, Minister Michael Lowry and others emerge in a report his sister commissioned from Price-Waterhouse. 
 1998 AIB bogus off-shore bank accounts : AIB facilitated DIRT Tax evasion by allowing Irish residents to have bogus "off-shore" accounts

2000s
 2000 Abbeylara siege and shooting: 27-year-old John Carthy with history of psychiatric illness shot dead by the Garda Emergency Response Unit after a 25-hour siege at his home
 Haughey/Lowry corruption allegations
 2000 FÁS expenses scandal: FÁS executives spent hundreds of thousands of euro on lavish holidays to the USA under the guise of promoting a Science Challenge programme
 2005 Jailing of the "Rossport Five: Five Co. Mayo Farmers who refuse to allow Shell Ireland lay a gas pipeline across their land are jailed for contempt of court
 2008 Personal Finances of Bertie Ahern: Following criticism by both the Mahon and Moriarty tribunals, the former Taoiseach's personal finances come under scrutiny by the media
 2008 Anglo Irish Bank hidden directors' loans Directors of Anglo Irish Bank borrowed over €100M to buy shares in the Bank and would temporarily transfer the loans to other financial institutions so they would not appear in their audited accounts

2010s
 2010 RTE Prime Time Report on Symphysiotomy: It is estimated that 1,500 women unknowingly and without consent underwent this barbaric obstetric procedure in the Republic of Ireland between 1944 and 1987
 2011 Double Irish, Dutch Sandwich & Green Jersey: Massive corporation Tax avoidance schemes facilitated by the Irish tax code enabling profit shifting to low-tax regimes 
 2013 Garda Penalty Points Cancellation: Garda "whistleblowers" allege that Gardaí across the state were favouring certain speeding drivers by cancelling (or failing to register) thousands of penalty points  
 2014 GSOC "Bugging" Investigation: The Garda Síochána Ombudsman Commission (GSOC) engaged UK security contractor Verrimus to "sweep" their offices.
 2014 Central Remedial Clinic Salary Top-Ups: Senior executives of CRC receive a statutory salary of over €100k from the HSE, which they “top-up” from charitable funds to more than double their salaries 
 2014 Garda whistleblower scandal: Two Gardaí who made separate "protected" disclosures complaining about poor standards in the force were ostracized by colleagues and superiors and subjected to a smear campaign by various agencies of the state
 2016 U.S. vulture funds paying no Irish Taxes US distressed debt funds file Irish company CRO accounts with large profits on Irish investments (made from 2012 onwards), but no Irish tax payments
 2016 Console Charity scandal: Founder of suicide charity Paul Kelly, his wife Patricia and son Tim, had run up a bill of almost €500,000 on the Charity's credit card to pay for a luxury car, foreign holidays, designer clothes, and tickets to major sporting events
 2017 Bogus Garda Breath Tests: The Garda was forced to admit that half of the two million alcohol breath tests it claimed were carried out on motorists between 2012 and 2016, were bogus.
2018 CervicalCheck cancer: Hundreds of women whose Cervical Smear tests were incorrectly reported have since developed full cancer. HSE delays engagement to minimize compensation
 2019 CSO Report on Irish Defense Forces:  Report shows that 85% of Irish military personnel earn less than the average industrial wage.

2020s

 2020 "Golf Gate": During Corona Virus Pandemic, Oireachtas Golf Society hosts post-tournament dinner at Clifden Hotel 
 2021 Mother and Baby Homes Commission Report: Commission of Investigation into Mother and Baby Homes publishes its long-delayed, final report omitting and redacting the testimonies of many survivors 
 2021 Dept. of Health autism dossiers: RTÉ Investigates documentary interviews a whistleblower alleging that the Dept. of Health was secretly gathering information from private consultations about the families, parents and siblings of children with autism
 Katherine Zappone controversy
 2021 Bóthar Charity embezzlement: Four managers of the Irish Livestock charity accused of misappropriating €1.1M in funds 
 2021 Inner City Helping Homeless: Charities Regulator winds up the company after founder and CEO is accused of sexually assaulting homeless men
 2021 Mica scandal: Decades-long failure to regulate Building materials results in thousand of homes crumbling in counties Donegal, Roscommon, Mayo and Clare and finally brings mass protests to the streets of Dublin
 2021 "Women of Honour" scandal: RTE radio documentary exposes institutional bullying, misogyny and sexual violence within the Irish Defense Forces.

References

+